Dale A. Craigwell (born April 24, 1971) is a Canadian former professional hockey player who played professionally for 9 years and played parts of 3 years with the San Jose Sharks in the NHL. He played centre and shot left-handed.

Biography
Craigwell was born in Toronto, Ontario. As a youth, he played in the 1984 Quebec International Pee-Wee Hockey Tournament with a minor ice hockey team from Oshawa.

Craigwell was drafted by the Sharks in the 10th round, 199th overall in the 1991 NHL Entry Draft. He was the 11th player ever drafted by the Sharks. Prior to being drafted he played in the Ontario Hockey League with the Oshawa Generals for 3 years, scoring 95 points in 56 games his final year there.

During the 1991–1992 NHL season, the first for the Sharks, Craigwell was called up in the middle of the season and skated in 32 games, scoring 16 points. The 1993–1994 season was the first for Craigwell to play full-time for the Sharks, but the results were dismal, as he was regulated to a defensive role and scored only 9 points the whole year. The following year he suffered an ankle injury and missed the entire 1994–1995 season. 

Craigwell then played for the Kansas City Blades in the now defunct IHL for 3 years, followed by 3 more years playing in Europe, one in Germany and two in England before retiring after the 2000–2001 season.

Career statistics

Regular season and playoffs

International

References

External links
 

1971 births
Augsburger Panther players
Black Canadian ice hockey players
Canadian ice hockey centres
Kansas City Blades players
Living people
Oshawa Generals players
San Francisco Spiders players
San Jose Sharks draft picks
San Jose Sharks players
Sheffield Steelers players
Ice hockey people from Toronto
Canadian expatriate ice hockey players in England
Canadian expatriate ice hockey players in Germany